I-6K is a Satellite bus developed by Indian Space Research Organisation (ISRO)  It will be a standard bus for  class communication satellites; the I in I-6K stands for INSAT and 6 signifies that it can support satellites up to 6,000 kg in weight. The I-6K spacecraft bus can supply DC power of 10 to 15 kilowatts.

References

Indian Space Research Organisation
Satellite buses